Badeleh (also Romanized as Bādeleh and Badleh) is a village in Kuhdasht-e Gharbi Rural District, in the Central District of Miandorud County, Mazandaran Province, Iran. At the 2006 census, its population was 1,810, in 492 families.

References 

Populated places in Miandorud County